Thomas Law (1 April 1908 – 17 February 1976) was a Scottish footballer. Playing at full-back, he spent his entire professional career at Chelsea.

Born in Glasgow, he signed for David Calderhead's Chelsea from local junior club Bridgeton Waverley and made his English Football League debut in 1926 against Bradford City. He soon established himself as Chelsea's first choice full-back, a position he would hold for most of his time at Stamford Bridge and was one of the less glamorous, though more reliable, members of a star-studded Chelsea squad which included his Scottish teammates, Hughie Gallacher, Alex Jackson, Willie Ferguson and Andy Wilson. He made 318 appearances for Chelsea, scoring 19 goals, mainly from penalties.

Law won two caps for Scotland, both against England. He made his debut during Scotland's famous "Wembley Wizards" 5–1 win over England at Wembley in 1928. His final cap came in the same fixture two years later, though this time the Scots lost 2–5.

References

External links 

 Chelsea FC 'former key player' profile

1908 births
1976 deaths
Scottish footballers
Scotland international footballers
Bridgeton Waverley F.C. players
Scottish Junior Football Association players
Chelsea F.C. players
Association football fullbacks
English Football League players
Footballers from Glasgow